Codevigo is a comune (municipality) in the Province of Padua in the Italian region Veneto, located about  southwest of Venice and about  southeast of Padua.

Codevigo borders the following municipalities: Arzergrande, Campagna Lupia, Chioggia, Correzzola, Piove di Sacco, Pontelongo.

The mayor of Codevigo is Annunzio Belan who is the leader of the citizens league "Cambiare si puo'" (transl. "It is possible to change") which won the administrative elections on 27 May 2013.

Demographic evolution

Twin towns – sister cities
Codevigo is twinned with:

  Szécsény, Hungary

References

Cities and towns in Veneto